Georgios Tzovaras (born 3 November 1999) is a Greek professional footballer who plays as a left-back for Super League club Atromitos.

Honours

Club
Slovan Bratislava
Slovnaft Cup: 2019–20

References

External links

1999 births
Living people
Association football defenders
Greek footballers
Greek expatriate footballers
PAOK FC players
ŠK Slovan Bratislava players
Apollon Larissa F.C. players
Niki Volos F.C. players
Atromitos F.C. players
Super League Greece players
Super League Greece 2 players
2. Liga (Slovakia) players
Expatriate footballers in Slovakia
Greek expatriate sportspeople in Slovakia
Footballers from Volos